January 2017 Mogadishu bombing may refer to: 

2 January 2017 Mogadishu bombings
Dayah Hotel attack on 25 January